Ralph Lawrence Rentz (born August 1, 1947) is a former American football defensive back who played one season with the San Diego Chargers of the American Football League (AFL). He was drafted by the Chargers in the 17th round of the 1969 NFL Draft.  He played college football for the University of Florida and attended Coral Gables Senior High School in Coral Gables, Florida.

References

External links
Just Sports Stats
College stats

Living people
1947 births
Players of American football from Miami
American football defensive backs
American football quarterbacks
Florida Gators football players
San Diego Chargers players
Coral Gables Senior High School alumni
American Football League players